Telesphore Placidus Toppo (born 15 October 1939) is an Indian cardinal and was the archbishop of the Roman Catholic Archdiocese of Ranchi from 1984 until his resignation was accepted on 24 June 2018.

A polyglot, Toppo speaks Sadri, Oraon (mother tongues), Hindi (official language), English and Italian.

Early life and ordination
Toppo was born in Chainpur, in the state of Bihar and now in Jharkhand, India, on 15 October 1939, the eighth of ten children. He and his family belonged to Adivasi community.

He studied at St. Xavier's College, Ranchi, and theology at the Pontifical Urbaniana University in Rome. He was ordained priest on 3 May 1969 by Bishop Franz von Streng.

Bishop
After a stint at Torpa (Jharkhand), as Headmaster of St Joseph's School and Director of the Lievens Vocational Center, Toppo was named Bishop of Dumka and received his episcopal consecration on 7 October 1978 from Archbishop Pius Kerketta SJ. He was appointed Coadjutor Archbishop of Ranchi, capital of the Jharkhand state, on 8 November 1984. He became Archbishop there on 7 August 1985.

Cardinal
Toppo was made cardinal-priest by Pope John Paul II on 21 October 2003, given the titular church of Sacro Cuore di Gesù agonizzante a Vitinia. He was the third cardinal from India, the first Adivasi. He said the title of cardinal was a "mark of distinction for the tribal Church in India and recognition of its growth".

He was elector at the 2005 papal conclave that elected Joseph Ratzinger as Pope Benedict XVI.

He was elected to serve a two-year term president of Catholic Bishops' Conference of India on two occasions, in 2004 and 2006. He also served as president of the Conference of Catholic Bishops of India, made up of Latin Rite bishops only, from 2001 to 2004 and from 2011 to 2013.

At the Synod of Bishops in 2008, he endorsed ecumenical efforts but warned against "dilution of the Truth" and called for agreement on a common date for the celebration of Easter. At the Synod on the New Evangelization in 2012, he called on religious orders to commit themselves anew to missionary work.

He was one of the cardinal electors who participated in the 2013 papal conclave that selected Pope Francis.

On 11 February 2008, he called for the proclamation of a new Marian dogma on Mary, Mediatrix of graces, Co-Redemptrix of humanity, with Jesus as sole and unique mediator.

Toppo sits on the Board of World Religious Leaders for the Elijah Interfaith Institute.

Pope Francis accepted Toppo's resignation as Archbishop of Ranchi on 24 June 2018, announcing as his successor Felix Toppo, Bishop of Jamshedpur.

References

External links

 
 Biography at catholic-pages.com

Indian cardinals
1939 births
Living people
20th-century Roman Catholic archbishops in India
21st-century Roman Catholic archbishops in India
Cardinals created by Pope John Paul II
Pontifical Urban University alumni
Adivasi people
People from Saharsa district